Tamil Nadu has the largest tourism industry in India with a percentage share of 21.31% and 21.86% of domestic and foreign tourist visits in the country. According to the 2020 Ministry of Tourism report, the number of domestic arrivals was at 494.8 million making the state the second most popular tourist destination in the country, and foreign arrivals numbered 6.86 million, the highest in the country, making it the most popular state for tourism in the country.

Tamil Nadu has more than 4,000 years of continuous cultural history. Tamil Nadu has some of the most remarkable temple architecture in the country, and a living tradition of music, dance, folk arts and fine arts. Tamil Nadu is well renowned for its temple towns and heritage sites, hill stations, waterfalls, national parks, local cuisine, natural environment and wildlife.

Economy and Tourism

Tamil Nadu with a GDP of $260 billion is the second largest economy of the country and Tourism is one of the main sources of its revenue. Tourism in the state is promoted by the Tamil Nadu Tourism Development Corporation headquartered in the capital city of Chennai. Tamil Nadu is a year-round tourist destination, and the industry is the largest in the country.

Major Cities of Tamil Nadu

Chennai

Chennai formerly known as Madras, is the capital city of the state, and India's fourth largest metropolis. The city is known for its beaches, ancient Tamil architecture, Anglo-Indian architecture, cultural festivals and is India's largest shopping destination. Chennai is seen as the gateway to Southern India and is well connected to all parts of India by road, rail and air.

The city is currently India's 4th largest and one of the world's fifty most largest ones. This city houses Asia's largest hospitals which has recently spurred a new wave of medical tourism.

Coimbatore
Coimbatore also called as textile city or cotton city is the second largest city in the state of Tamil Nadu. It is often referred to as the Manchester of South India due to its growing commercial importance. Coimbatore is situated in the Western end of Tamil Nadu and is well connected by road, rail and air with major towns and cities in India.

Madurai

Madurai is the third largest city by population in Tamil Nadu and the second largest corporation in Tamil Nadu. Madurai has been a major settlement for two millennia. Madurai was the longest continuous capital city until British rule in India, and was the first major settlement in central and southern Asia. It is one of India's temple towns. It is also called Temple city, Athens of East, City of Junctions, City of Festival, Jasmine city, Sleepless city (Thoonga Nagaram). The city is synonymous with Tamil Literature, Tamil was patronised by the city and vice versa. Madurai is the topmost tourism hub of Tamil Nadu. Madurai is the cultural headquarters of Tamil Nadu, Madurai is the major city to attract more Foreigners next only to Chennai. Madurai also ancient city its living civilization is more than 4000 years. While Pandiyan emperor it is the capital of Pandyan Kingdom. Madurai continues to be a cultural hot spot in the state and is a major tourist destination for overseas visitors.

Meenakshi Temple
The Sri Meenakshi temple is located in Madurai. The temple in the present form was re- constructed by the pandyas of Madurai. The temple has a 1000 pillar hall, 14 towers with remarkable art, architecture and painting. Thirugnanasambandar the Hindu Saint has mentioned the temple in his songs which go back to the early 7th century. At least 15,000 visitors visit these temples regularly which include both Indians and Foreigners. The temple is now administered by HR and CE department of Tamil Nadu.

Thirumalai Nayak Mahal
Thirumalai Nayak Mahal is located at a distance of 2 km from Meenakshi Amman Temple. The palace is a testament to the Indian art and architecture. There are 248 pillars in the palace, each 58 feet tall and 5 feet in diameter. The paintings in the palace reflect the art of painting prevailed in the 16th century. Only a part of the largest palace is allowed for sightseeing. In this palace of rectangular shape, audio-visuals are shown in the evenings. The Mahal is open to general public between 9 am to 1 pm and between 2 pm to 5 pm. Sound and light show: English at 6.45 pm, Tamil will be played at 8.15 pm. The city is 450 km from Chennai and has a major railway junction and an airport 12 km from the city.

Thiruparankundram Dargah

Thiruparankundram Dargah at the top of Thiruparankundram hills the Shrine of Hazrat Sulthan Sikandar Badusha Shahhed, who came along with Badusha Sulthan Syed Ibrahim Shaheed of Erwadi. People of all faiths majorly from the neighbouring state of Kerala visit this shrine at the top of the hill. The shrine is open from 5AM until 9PM.

Kazimar Big mosque and Madurai Maqbara

Kazimar Big Mosque is the first mosque in Madurai built in the year 1284 under the supervision of Hazrat Kazi Syed Tajuddin in a land donated by the pandiya kings. Madurai Maqbara the shrine of 3 great Sufi saints of Madurai is located within the mosque.

Gorippalayam
Goripalayam Dargah is the tomb of the Sulthans of Madurai Hazrat Sulthan Alauddin Badusha and Hazrat Sulthan Shamsuddin Badusha. It is located in the heart of Madurai city in the northern banks of river vaigai.
Madurai is well connected with major cities in India by Madurai International Airport  and main railway junction Madurai Junction.

Tiruchirappalli

Tiruchirappalli also called Tiruchi or Trichy, is a city in the Indian state of Tamil Nadu and the administrative headquarters of Tiruchirappalli District. It is the fourth largest municipal corporation and the fourth largest urban agglomeration in the state. Occupying , the city was home to 916,674 people as of 2011.

Tiruchirappalli's recorded history begins in the 3rd century BC, when it was under the rule of the Cholas. The city has also been ruled by the Pandyas, Pallavas, Vijayanagar Empire, Nayak dynasty, the Carnatic state and the British. The most prominent historical monuments in Tiruchirappalli include the Rockfort, the Ranganathaswamy Temple, Srirangam and the Jambukeswarar Temple, Thiruvanaikaval. The archaeologically important town of Uraiyur, capital of the Early Cholas, is now a part of Tiruchirappalli. The city played a critical role in the Carnatic Wars (1746–1763) between the British and the French East India companies.

The most commonly used modes of local transport in Tiruchirappalli are the state government-owned Tamil Nadu State Transport Corporation (TNSTC) buses, and auto rickshaws. Tiruchirappalli forms a part of the Kumbakonam division of the TNSTC. The city has two major bus termini; Chatram Bus Stand and Central Bus Stand, both of which operate intercity services and local transport to suburban areas.

Tiruchirappalli sits at the confluence of two major National Highways—NH 38 and NH 83. NH 38 is one of the most congested highways in south India and carries almost 10,000 lorries on the Tiruchirappalli–Chennai stretch every night. Other National Highways originating in the city are NH 536 and NH 81. State highways that start from the city include SH 25 and SH 62. Tiruchirappalli has  of road maintained by the municipal corporation. A semi-ring road connecting all the National Highways is being constructed to ease traffic congestion in the city. As of 2013, approximately 328,000 two-wheelers, 93,500 cars and 10,000 public transport vehicles operate within the city limits, apart from the 1,500 inter-city buses that pass through Tiruchirappalli daily. Tiruchirappalli suffers from traffic congestion mainly because of its narrow roads and absence of an integrated bus station.

Passenger trains also carry a significant number of passengers from nearby towns. The Great Southern of India Railway Company was established in 1853 with its headquarters at England. In 1859, the company constructed its first railway line connecting Tiruchirappalli and Nagapattinam. The company merged with the Carnatic Railway Company in 1874 to form the South Indian Railway Company with Tiruchirappalli as its headquarters. The city retained the position until 1908 when the company's headquarters was transferred to Madras.  is the second biggest railway station in Tamil Nadu and one of the busiest in India. It constitutes a separate division of the Southern Railway. Tiruchirappalli has rail connectivity with most important cities and towns in India.

The Railway Heritage Centre was formally inaugurated on 18 February 2014, and is located adjacent to the Rail Kalyana Manadapam (Community Hall), near Tiruchirappalli Junction.

Tiruchirappalli is served by Tiruchirappalli International Airport (IATA: TRZ, ICAO: VOTR),  from the city centre. It is the 10th busiest airport in the country in terms of international traffic. The airport handles fivefold more international air traffic than domestic services, making it the only airport in India with this huge variation. It serves as a gateway to immigrants from South-east Asian countries. There are regular flights to Chennai, Colombo, Dubai, Kuala Lumpur, Mumbai and Singapore. The airport handled more than 1 million passengers and 2012 tonnes of cargo during the fiscal year 2013–14.

Salem

Salem is a city of Tamil Nadu state in southern India. Salem is the district headquarters and other major towns in the city include Edappadi, Mettur, Omalur and Attur. Salem is surrounded by hills and the landscape dotted with hillocks. Salem has a vibrant culture dating back to the ancient Kongu Nadu. As a district, Salem has its significance in various aspects; it is known for mango cultivation, silver ornaments, textile, sago industries and steel production. As of 2011, the district had a population of 3,482,056 with a sex-ratio of 954 females for every 1,000 males. Salem is one of the biggest cities in Tamil Nadu. Tourist places include Yercaud, Mettur Dam, Kailasanathar Temple, Kottai Mariamman Temple. Salem is connected with other parts of Tamil Nadu and other states by road, rail and bus.

Salem's traditional shopping areas are in the Town area, with major retailers in Bazaar Street, Car Street, First Agraharam and Chinna Kadai Street. Shevapet and the Fort area are noted for hardware and furniture, and Leigh Bazaar in Shevapet is the main wholesale market. Reliance Shopping Mall, the city's largest shopping complex is situated near Five Roads. Kurumbapatti Zoological Park and Anna Park are government-run parks. Paravasa Ulagam and Dream Land are amusement parks in the city.

Airports Authority of India (AAI) opened the airport in 1993 for commercial operations.

Salem has six arterial roads: Omalur Road, Cherry Road, Saradha College Road, Junction Main Road, Gugai Main Road and Attur Road. Three National Highways originate in or pass through: NH 44 (Srinagar – Kanyakumari), NH 544 (Salem – Kochi via Erode and Coimbatore) and NH 79 (Salem – Ulundurpet).

Salem is the headquarters of the Salem division of TNSTC. The city has two major bus stations: the MGR Integrated Bus Terminus in Meyyanoor and the Town Bus Station (Old Bus Stand) in the town area. Intercity and interstate routes and private buses originate at the Central Bus Stand, and local buses originate at the Old Bus Stand. The Anna Flyover is the oldest in the city, and the Trumpet Interchange was built in the realignment of NH 544 to ease traffic towards Coimbatore.

In 2005, the Railway Board approved the creation of a Salem railway division from Palakkad and Tiruchirapalli divisions. It is the fourth-largest of the six Southern Railway zone divisions. Salem Railway Junction has been rated as the most clean station among the divisional headquarters railway stations and also the ninth cleanest railway station in the entire country, according to a survey report published in June 2017.

Erode
Erode ([iːroːɽɯ]) is the administrative headquarters of Erode District in the South Indian state of Tamil Nadu. Located on the banks of River Kaveri, and has been ruled, at different times, by the Early Pandyas, Medieval Cholas, Later Cholas, Vijayanagar Empire, Madurai Nayaks, Hyder Ali, Carnatic kingdom, and the British. Hand loom, power loom textile products and ready made garments industries contribute to the economy of the city. The people in the city are employed in various textile, oil and turmeric manufacturing industries.

Being the district headquarters, Erode accommodates the district administration offices, government educational institutes, colleges and schools. Erode is a part of Erode constituency (Erode East and Erode West) and elects its member of legislative assembly every five years, and a part of the Erode constituency that elects its member of parliament. The city is administered by a municipal corporation established in 2009 as per the Municipal Corporation Act. The city covers an area of 8.99 km2 and had a population of 173,600 in 2001. The provisional population totals of the 2011 census indicate the population of the city is 521,776. Roadways is the major mode of transport to the city, while it has also got rail connectivity. The nearest airport is Coimbatore International Airport, located at a distance of 90 km from the city.

Vellore

Vellore is a city and the administrative headquarters of Vellore District in the South Indian state of Tamil Nadu. It is on the banks of Palar River and has been ruled, at different times, by the Pallavas, Medieval Cholas, Later Cholas, Vijayanagar Empire, Rashtrakutas, Carnatic kingdom, and the British. Vellore has historic Vellore Fort and buildings, Government Museum, Science Park, Religious Places like Jalakandeswarar Temple, Srilakshmi Golden Temple, Big Mosque and St. Johns church, Amirthi Zoological Park and Yelagiri Hill station are the among top tourist attractions in and around Vellore City.

Thoothukudi
Thoothukudi is a commercial city on the sea shore which serves the inland cities of Southern India and is one of the sea gateways of Tamil Nadu. There are stretches of sunny and sandy beaches that are restful and calm. There are several towns that have historical and religious significance that are around Thoothukudi. It has a railway terminus and a domestic airport with regular flights to Chennai.

Tirunelveli
Tirunelveli is an ancient city and is home to many temples and shrines, including the largest Shiva temple in Tamil Nadu, the Nellaiappar Temple. It is located on the western side of the perennial Thamirabarani river, whereas its twin municipal city Palayamkottai, is located on the eastern side. It has a major railway junction and is situated 620 kilometres southwest of the state capital, Chennai.

UNESCO World Heritage Sites
The state houses a number of heritage sites mainly composed of the ancient temples and deities of the Pallava and Chola empire scattered along various parts of Northern and Central-Eastern parts of Tamil Nadu. The following are the list of the Heritage sites in the state.

The Chola Temples

The Great Living Chola Temples constructed by the king Raja Raja Chola and his son Rajendra are  part of the Cultural heritage site which includes the three great temples of 11th and 12th century namely, the Brihadisvara Temple at Thanjavur, the Brihadisvara Temple at Gangaikondacholisvaram and the Airavatesvara Temple at Darasuram.

Thanjavur – The home to the Chola Kingdom and the location of the Brihadisvara Temple built in the 11th century.

Gangaikonda Cholapuram – The capital of the Chola kingdom for 250 years.

Darasuram – A small town close to Kumbakonam, the town has the prestigious Airavatesvara Temple dedicated to Lord Shiva along with the Brihadeeswara Temple and the temple of the Gangaikonda Cholapuram are three of the most venerated and architectural legacies of the Chola empire.

Group of Monuments in Mahabalipuram

The Group of Monuments at Mahabalipuram declared as a World Heritage Site in 1984, in Tamil Nadu, about 58 km from Chennai, were built by the Pallava kings in the 7th and 8th centuries. The town is said to have gained prominence under the rule of Mamalla. These monuments have been carved out of rock along the Coromandel coast. The following are the sites related. These monuments surprisingly survived the 2004 Tsunami that devastated the other coastal towns nearby.

Ratha Temples: Temples in the form of chariots.
The 11 Mandapas: Cave sanctuaries dedicated to various deities.
Rock Reliefs that include Descent of the Ganges and the Arjuna's Penance.
The Shore Temple and the other temples cut out of rock.
The Seven Pagodas

Karaikudi

Karaikudi is the famous heritage site of Tamil Nadu for its culture and its state or art architecture.
It has the famous building called "Aairam jannal veedu"(Thousand windows house) which is Chettinad style.

The Nilgiri Mountain Railway
Part of the Mountain railways of India, the Nilgiri Mountain Railway (NMR) was stated to be an "outstanding examples of bold, ingenious engineering solutions for the problem of establishing an effective rail link through a rugged, mountainous terrain." The Nilgiri Mountain Railway was added to the list in 2005 preceding the Kalka-Shimla Railway which was granted the status in 2008.

The Route passes through the various terrains and thickly forested areas of the Nilgiri Mountains. The route consists of the following stations:

Mettupalayam
Kaalar
Hillgrove
Runneymede
Kateri Road
Coonor
Wellington
Aruvankadu
Ketti
Lovedale
Ooty

Religious sites of Tamil Nadu

Tamil Nadu has the credit of having 34000 Hindu temples some of which are several centuries old. The cities in ancient Tamil Nadu is believed to have revolved around the magnificent temples built by the Pallava, Chola and Pandya empires and therefore most of the cities in the state have a lot of religious significance and contain a number of temples and shrines in and around their limits. Temple towns like Madurai and Kanchipuram are thronged by visitors throughout the year.

Caves

Kalugumalai 

Kalugumalai consist of three important Temples in Kalugumalai, Thoothukudi District:
 Kalugumalai Jain Beds : There are many rock relief sculptures dating to the 8th-9th century A.D. in the area, including the rock cut image of Bhagawan Parshwanatha flanked by two Yaksha, as well as many other rock cut images of other tirthankaras. The sculptures and the epigraphs are to be assigned to the reign of Pandya, Parantaka Nedunjadaiya (A.D. 768–800). There are approximately 150 niches in the bed, that includes images of Gomateshwara, Parshvanatha and other Tirthankaras of the Jainism. The Jain beds are maintained and administered by Department of Archaeology of the Government of Tamil Nadu as a protected monument.
 Vettuvan Koil :  is a Hindu temple built between the 8th and 9th century. Kalugumalai is a priceless unfinished Pandyan monolith cave temple, part of the iconographic richness that helped chronicle the burgeoning richness of the Tamil culture, traditions, and sacred centres containing religious art. The carvings in the temple show the top portion of the temple, with an unfinished bottom. The granite rock looks like a blooming lotus, with hills surrounding it on three sides. The vimana (ceiling over the sanctum) has niches of Parsavadevatas, the attendant deities of Shiva, like ganas, Dakshinamurthy depicted playing a mridanga, Siva with his consort Uma, dancers, various niches of Nandi (the sacred bull of Shiva) and animals like monkeys and lions.
 
 Kalugasalamoorthy Temple : The main deity of this temple is Murugan. The main deity hall and entrance hall is excavated inside the foothills of kalugumalai in the south western corner of the hill and with external structural additions. The temple has many aesthetic sculptures. The temple dates to the 18th century.

Chitharal Jain Monuments 

Chitharal Jain Monuments or Chitharal Malai Kovil are situated on the Thiruchanattu Malai (Thiruchanattu hillocks) near Chitharal village, Kanyakumari district, Tamil Nadu, India. There are two monuments. The earlier rock-cut Jain structure of beads with inscriptions and drip-ledges is the earliest Jain monument in the southernmost part of India which was from first century BC to sixth century AD. The temple monuments were likely built by Digambara Jains in the ninth century when the region was under influence of Jainism. Jain influence in this region was due to the King Mahendravarman I (610–640).

Sittanavasal Cave 

The Sittanavasal Cave is a rock-cut monastery or temple located in Pudukkottai District Created by Jains, it is called the Arivar Koil, and is a rock cut cave temple of the Arihants. It contains remnants of notable frescoes from the 7th century. The murals have been painted with vegetable and mineral dyes in black, green, yellow, orange, blue, and white. Paintings have been created by applying colours over a thin wet surface of lime plaster. Temple-cave was initially dated to Pallava King Mahendravarman I (580–630 AD) prior to his conversion from Jainism to Hinduism as a Shaivite. However, an inscription attributes its renovation to a Pandyan king probably Maran Sendan (654–670 AD) or Arikesari Maravarman (670–700 AD).

Sittanavasal is a rock-cut cave, situated on the western side of central part of a hill, which runs in a north–south direction. The Jain natural caverns, called Ezhadippattam are approached from the foothills. The cave is approached by climbing a few 100 steps.

The architectural features of the Sittanvasal Cave include the painting and sculptures found within its precincts. Archaeological Survey of India is responsible for the maintenance of the cave and the Jain beds.

Samanar Hills 

Samanar Hills or Samanar Malai is a hill rock complex located in Keelakuyilkudi village,  from Madurai, Tamil Nadu, India.

Samanar Malai has several Tamil-Brahmi inscriptions, a number of stone beds and many sculptures, which shows authority for Jainism in the ancient Tamil country. The hill contains two noted sculptures, Settipodavu and Pechipallam, that show images of Jain Tirthankaras made by Jain monks in the 9th century BCE. The Settipodavu contains the image of Mahavira, the last tirthankara of Jainism. The Pechipallam contains eight sculptures, including Bahubali and Mahavira.

More than 2000 years old Tamil-Brahmi inscriptions and Vatteluttu writings.

Temples, Mosques and Churches

Velankanni 

Velankanni is located 12 km south of Nagapattinam on the Eastern coast. The town is home to a significant Roman Catholic shrine dedicated to Our lady of Good Health. Virgin Mary is believed to have miraculous healing powers. In 1560, Virgin Mary is said to have appeared to a shepherd, asking him for milk to quench the thirst of baby Jesus. When the shepherd returned to his master, after performing the good deed, his pitcher kept filling up with milk. Consequently, a small thatched chapel was built at the site. At the end of the 16th century, Virgin Mary appeared again in front of a lame boy, who regained the use of his limbs. The actual church was constructed after the incident. Thus, the pope in the Vatican City has declared Velankanni as a Holy City. Thousands of pilgrims belonging to various castes and communities flock daily to this 'Lourdes of the East'.

Chidambaram 
Chidambaram in Cuddalore District is the seat of the cosmic dancer Lord Nataraja (Ananda Tandava pose; the Cosmic Dance of bliss). It is one of the Pancha Bhutasthalas. The Chidambaram Temple dedicated to Lord Natraja built in the 9th century has an unusual hut-like sanctum with a gold-plated roof
and four towering gopuras. Many Chola kings were crowned here in the presence of the deity. Nearby a sculptural temple is Melakadambur, with its distinct architecture that makes it resemble a chariot.there have sri perumal temple.

Ervadi 

Erwadi is a small town in Ramanathapuram district which houses the 840-year-old shrine and the graves of Hazrat Sulthan Syed Ibrahim Shaheed badusha and the graves of a few thousands of His friends, family and followers who came from Saudi Arabia in the mid 12th century. The site is well known for its spiritual healing for mental and magical diseases. Kattupalli, Meesal, Natham (Keelakarai), Sundaramudayan, Thachu oorani, Vaippar and Valinokkam are some notable shrines within the district and near by. The Annual Santhanakoodu festival held during the Islamic month of Dhul Qidah is very well recognized and witnessed by more than 1 million people from different region and of all faiths.

Kancheepuram

One of the most visited destinations in the state, Kanchipuram was the capital of the ancient Pallava Kingdom and is considered one of the seven holiest cities to the Hindus of India. Hundreds of ancient temples are located in this town, though most of them are in ruins, there are a few prominent ones which attract a large number of devotees every year.

The Kailashnathar Temple dedicated to Lord Shiva is the oldest temple of Kanchi. It reflects the grandeur and the splendor of the early Dravidian style of temple architecture built by the Pallava king Rayasimha. This temple was constructed in the late seventh century AD and the eighth century remains of murals within the temple are an indication of the magnificence of the original temple that was supposed to exist much before than the temple today. The Ekambareswarar Temple built by the Pallavas and extended by the Cholas is another temple in the town sprawling over a large area of 12 hectares.

The Kamakshi Amman Temple dedicated to Goddess Parvati is the main pilgrimage center in the town and one of the three temples of worship of Goddess Parvati in Tamil Nadu.

The Trilokyanatha Temple is a Jain temple built by King Simhavishnu is dedicated to Mahavira.

The Varadharaja Perumal Temple, the Devarajswmi Temple and the Pandava Thoothar Perumal Temple are the other major temples in the environs.

Kanniyakumari
Kanniyakumari is the tip of peninsular India where the Bay of Bengal, Indian Ocean and Arabian Sea meet. The southernmost tip of the subcontinent, Kanniyakumari is known for the Hazrat Peer Mohammed waliyullah Dargah, Kumari Amman Temple, Gandhi Memorial Mandapam, Vivekananda Rock Memorial and the Thanumalayan Temple. Other religious sites include the Mondaicaud Bhagavathi Temple, Sri Adikesavaperumal Temple, St. Xavier's Church, devasahayam mount, St. Therese of Infant Jesus church and the St. Arockiya Nathar Church within the district..

Kumbakonam

Kumbakonam, 40 km from Thanjavur, has about 188 temples within its municipal limits. Apart from these a thousand more are estimated to be nearby. The Adi Kumbeswarar Temple is the biggest Saivite temples in the region and has a huge complex covering an area of 30,181 sq ft having three gopurams in the Northern, Eastern and Western entrances of the temple.

After the Adi Kumbeshwara Temple, the second most important landmark s the Ramaswamy Temple dedicated to Lord Rama from the epic of Ramayana and has a no. of intricate carvings within its pillars depicting the various scenes of the epic.

The Kashi Vishwanath Temple here is another example of ancient Dravidian architecture in the region. The tank of the temple contains the waters of the 9 holy rivers in Hindu mythology namely Ganga, Yamuna, Narmada, Saraswati, Kaveri, Godavari, Tungabhadra, Krishna and Sarayu and a no. of pilgrims visit this temple on the Mahamaham festival once in 12 years to bathe in the waters of the tank which they believe would purify them from their sins.

The Sarangapani Temple is one of the five most important Vaishanavaite pilgrimage centres in South India and had the tallest Gopuram in the region before the temple town of Srirangam was built. To the south of the temple is the Someswar Temple another flagship of Dravidian architecture.

Madurai

Madurai also called as "Temple city". Madurai consists of major temples. Madurai being one of the world's oldest inhabited cities is the home to several temples built by the Pandyan and Nayak kings, including the Meenakshi Amman Temple which dates back to 2000 years. The city and the life of its inhabitants revolve around the temple which is one of the largest Hindu temples by size and enclosure. Every year, hundreds of thousands of tourists visit this temple and the surroundings.

The Mariamman Theppakulam built in 1636 is a huge tank at the eastern end of the city and is almost equal in area to that of the Meenakshi Amman temple. To its side is a temple dedicated to Parvati, and every year a local festival celebrating Goddess Meenakshi's wedding is held in the month of January/February.

Madurai is also situated close to the Thirupparamkunram Murugan Temple and Pazhamudircholai, two of the Six Abodes of Lord Subramanya.

Thiruparankundram Dargah at the top of Thiruparankundram hill is a well-known Islamic shrine. Madurai is also known for its two mosques one being the Kazimar Big Mosque constructed by Kazi Syed Tajuddin, a descendant of Prophet Muhammed the oldest Islamic monument in Madurai. Madurai Maqbara the dargah of 3 Shadhuli Sufi saints is located within the mosque. The other is the Goripalayam Mosque the tombs of two of the Delhi Sultans.

Nagore
Nagore, a town north of Nagapattinam, is the home to the tomb of Meeran Sahib Abdul Qadir Shahul Hamid Badshah also known as the Nagore Durgah a spiritual place for all faiths. The Durgah as it stands now was built by devotees whose wishes were fulfilled by praying Shahul. It is believed that 60 percent of the shrines were built by Hindus and there are other shrines built in his honour in Penang (Malaysia) and Singapore. The urs festival celebrated every year draws Hindus and Muslims from all over the world.

Palani

The largest pilgrimage center in Tamil Nadu and the second largest in South India after Tirupati, Palani is the most famous of the Six Abodes of Murugan (Arupadai Veedu Temple Tour). During the Thai Poosam festival, the temple attracts over 7 million devotees, many of whom do a lot of penances and acts such as shaving their heads, walking barefoot all the way from their homes etc. to show their devotion. A cable-car service ferries devotees to the top of the hill. Palani is also a base for hikes in the surrounding hills. A railway station links the town to Coimbatore and Madurai.

Rameshwaram

, Ramanathapuram

Situated at the tip of the Pamban Island and 50 km from the coast of Sri Lanka, is considered to be as sacred as Varanasi and is a bustling pilgrimage center. Named after Lord Rama who according to the Legend embarked his journey to Sri Lanka from this town, Rameshwaram is a place of wide religious significance. The city is one of the holiest Hindu Char Dham shrines that has to be visited in one's lifetime and this island Temple is connected by the scenic Pamban Bridge over the sea for 2.3 km.

The Ramanathaswamy Temple, the most important of them all is believed to be constructed at the spot where Lord Rama had offered his prayers to Shiva. The construction of the temple as it stands today, was started in the 12th century and ended in the 19th century. The most interesting feature in the temple is the 1,220m long corridor (the longest in India) with carvings on its pillars, walls and ceiling.

The Kothandaramaswamy Temple situated on the shore of Dhanushkodi is supposed to be the place where Vibishena the brother of Raavana, had met Rama's army and joined hands. The temple miraculously survived the 1964 Cyclone that destroyed most of the region and receives a good number of visitors.

The village of Devipatinam 20 km from Ramnathapuram has a temple dedicated to Lord Jagannatha and about hundred yards in the sea are naturally existing nine blocks of stone, supposed to be the Navagrahas, the nine planets.

Srirangam
Srirangam, Tiruchirappalli another example of classic temple town, houses the Ranganathaswamy Temple a major pilgrimage destination for the Vaishnava community.

East of the Rangnathasamy temple is the 17th-century temple town of Jambukeshvar Temple, in the town of Tiruvanaikka an important destination for worshipers of Lord Shiva.

Thiruvannamalai

In Arunachaleshwara Temple of Thiruvannamalai, Siva is worshipped in the form of fire. The temple town of Thiruvannamalai is one of the most ancient heritage sites of India and is a centre of the Saiva religion. The Arunachala hill and its environs have been held in regard by the Tamils for centuries. The temple is grand in conception and architecture and is rich in tradition, history and festivals. The main Deepam festival attracts devotees from far and wide throughout South India. A number of spiritual centres are also located in the region:

Sri Seshadri Swamigal Ashram:It was created by the Mahan Sri Seshadri Swamigal lived in the late 20th century. People from all over the world visit this Ashram, which is situated near the Sri Ramana Ashram.
Sri Ramana Ashram: Mahan Ramana Maharshi lived in Thiruvannamalai town. Sri Ramana Ashram is a holy place in this town. People from throughout the globe visit this Ashram. He attained mukthi in the year 1950.
Yogi Ram Surathkumar Ashram: Yogi Ram Surathkumar Ashram, also known as Visiri Samiyar Ashram, is situated near the Ramana Ashram. He attained mukthi/salvation in the year of 2000.

Tirumalai
Temple is famous for paintings that have been added to the site between the 15th-17th centuries. Arahanthgiri Jain Math is a Jain Matha that was established near the site in August, 1998.

Thiruvarur

Sri Thyagaraja Temple is a Hindu temple dedicated to Lord Thyagaraja located in the town of Tiruvarur in Tamil Nadu, India. The temple is revered by the Thevaram hymns of Saiva nayanars, 7th century Tamil saint poets and classified as Paadal Petra Sthalam. The temples complex occupies an area of around 33 acres with the Kamalalayam tank to its west. There are numerous shrines and mandapas (halls) in the three spacious enclosures (prakaram). The two main shrines of the temple are for Valmikinathar (Lord Siva) and Thyagarajar. Of the two, the former is the most ancient, and derives its name from tha anthill (putru), which takes the place of linga in the main shrine. , the 7th-century poet saint, refers to the main deity in his hymn as puttritrukondan (one who resides in the ant hill). The Stala vriksham (temple tree) is patiri (trumpet flower tree). The principles and practises of tree-worship and ophilotary are ancient bases whereupon a later date linga worship seems to have been established.[1]
Here all the 9 Navagrahams located towards south in straight line also located in northwest corner of 1st (prakaram). This temple hold the record of having maximum sannithis in India.
The temple hosts the annual car festival in March for ten days. Animated crowd push and pull the largest temple car of Tamil Nadu and its smaller cars on the laborious path around the surrounding streets.

Tiruchendur

Another of the Six Abodes, the Thiruchendur Murugan Temple located here attracts hundreds of thousands of devotees. The temple is situated so close to the sea that waves from the Gulf of Mannar lap at the eastern perimeter wall of the temple. The temple however had no damage done by the 2004 tsunami.

The other temples in the town and its neighbourhood are:

 Sri Ponvandu Aiyanar temple, at the hamlet called Nainarpattu.
 Sri Karkuvel Aiyanar temple, at the hamlet called Theri Kudiirruppu near Kayamozhi.
 A temple to Arunchunai Kattha Aiyanar Swami is located at a nearby natural spring called "Sunai".
 Nallur Thirunageshwaramudayar with the Aramvalartha Nayagi Sivan temple. An old temple, the Santhana Mariyamman temple, is also nearby. This Ambal is a fertility shrine.
 A thousand-year-old Sri Somanatha temple is situated at Authoor, 18 km from Thiruchendur.
 Kulasekaranpatinam, a village 13 km away, is known for its Dasara festival. The village has the only temple where Muthu Aara Amman / Muthu Maalai Amman (Aaram and Maalai means garland in Tamil language) is shown with his consort.
 Located about 10 km from Thiruchendur, the village of Melaputhukudi is considered a holy place because of its ancestral Aiyanar temple, which includes a thalampoo grove, which is popular as a picnic.

Tiruchirapalli

Tiruchirapalli, it is also a known temple city of Tamil Nadu. Tiruchirappalli (Trichy, in short) is nicknamed as "ROCK FORT CITY", age of Rock fort is 3.8 billion years one of the oldest rock formations in the world, which is older than Himalayas and Greenland. Trichy has many temples in and around the city. The 'Ucchi Pillayar' shrine located at the top of the prominent ruins of the Rock Fort is the popular temple in the city. Tiruchirapalli is also very close to the Parvati temple in Samayanallur and the temple towns of Srirangam and Tiruvanaikkaval.

Srirangam is famous for its Sri Ranganathaswamy Temple, a major pilgrimage destination for Hindus (including Srivaishnavites) and the largest temple complex in India.

Angkor Wat is bigger but non-functioning.

Srirangam is the foremost of the eight self-manifested shrines (Swayam Vyakta Kshetras) of Lord Vishnu. It is also considered the first, foremost and the most important of the 108 main Vishnu temples (Divyadesams). This temple is also known as Thiruvaranga Tirupati, Periyakoil, Bhoologa Vaikundam, Bhogamandabam. In the Vaishnava parlance the term "KOIL" signifies this temple only. The temple is enormous in size. It has seven prakaras or enclosures. These enclosures are formed by thick and huge rampart walls which run round the sanctum. There are 21 magnificent towers in all prakaras providing a unique sight to any visitor. The temple town lies on an islet formed by the twin rivers Cauvery and Coleroon.

The Srirangam temple complex is composed of 7 concentric walled sections and 21 towers gopuram.

The temple has seven prakaras (elevated enclosures) with gopurams articulating the axial path, the highest at the outermost prakara and the lowest at the innermost. In historic times, just after the construction of this temple, the city of Srirangam lived completely within the walls of this temple and hence is quoted as an example of Hindu religious utopia – during its peak of existence.

The Srirangam temple is one of the three temples of the god Ranganatha that are situated in the natural islands formed in the Kaveri river.

There is a gopuram fully made of gold, which is protected by electrical fence.

Clothes such as Silk Sarees, Dhoti, Towels, etc.., used for religious purposes are auctioned here.

Inside the temple compound, there is a separate temple for the goddess Andal. Additionally, There is a museum, a library and a bookshop as well.

Thiruvanaikaval (Thiru+Aanai+kaval) or Thiruvanaikoil is a suburb of the city of Tiruchirappalli in Tamil Nadu, India. It is situated on the northern banks of the Kaveri river adjacent to Srirangam Island. The island [Thiruvanaikaval-Srirangam ] is surrounded by river kaveri (southern) and river kollidam (northern), The Kollidam is the northern distributary of the Kaveri River. The Jambukeswarar Temple is located here. The temple's presiding deity is Lord Shiva (Jambukeswara) and the goddess is Sree Akilandeswari. It is revered as one of the Pancha-Bhoota Stalams (Water). There is a freshwater spring underneath the Shiv Linga. Sree Adi Shankara is said to have visited this shrine and has done the Thadanga (Ear Rings) Pratishta for the goddess to ensure that she remains in a Sowmya Roopa. It is also the birthplace of the world-renowned Nobel Laureate C. V. Raman.

Ucchi Pillayar koil, (Tamil: உச்சிப் பிள்ளையார் கோயில்) is a 7th-century Hindu temple, one dedicated to Lord Ganesh located a top of Rockfort, Trichy, Tamil Nadu, India. Mythologically this rock is the place where Lord Ganesh ran from King Vibishana, after establishing the Ranganathaswamy deity in Srirangam.

Samayapuram Mariamman Temple is a Hindu temple in Samayapuram near Tiruchirappalli in Tamil Nadu, India. The main deity, Samayapurathal or Mariamman is made of sand and clay like many of the traditional Mariamman deities, and hence unlike many other Hindu deities there are no abhishekams (sacred washing) conducted to the main deity, but instead the "abishekam" is done to the small stone statue in front of it.

It is believed by the devotees that the Goddess has enormous powers over curing illnesses and hence, it is a ritual to buy small metallic replicas, made with silver or steel, of various body parts that need to be cured, and these are deposited in the donation box.

Devotees also offer mavilakku, (Tamil – மாவிளக்கு) a sweet dish made of jaggery, rice flour and ghee. Offerings of raw salt is also made to the Goddess by the rural devotees.

The temple attracts thousands of devotees on Sundays, Tuesdays and Fridays, the holy days for Mariamman. Samayapuram is the second most wealthy (in terms of cash flows) temple in Tamil Nadu after Palani.

Dhyanalinga 

Dhyanalinga is a yogic temple located at the Velliangiri Mountains, 30 kilometers from Coimbatore. The temple was created by Sadhguru, founder of Isha Foundation, and is dedicated as a meditative space. It is maintained in total silence. The linga is 13 feet 9 inches in height, and is one of the tallest lingas in the world. It is said to contain all seven chakras in an energized form. Around 600,000 devotees visit the temple on Maha Shivaratri day. Near the Dhyanalinga is the Linga Bhairavi temple, dedicated to the mother goddess, Linga Bhairavi. The devi is uniquely in the form of a linga.

The Dhyanalinga premises are also the location of the 112-foot Adiyogi statue, which was inaugurated by the Prime Minister of India, Narendra Modi, on Maha Shivaratri, 2017. The statue represents Shiva as the Adiyogi or first yogi, and the Adi Guru or first Guru, who offered yoga to humanity. It is the tallest bust of Shiva in the world. The height of the statue – 112 feet – represents the 112 ways Adiyogi is said to have offered, in which a human being can attain mukti.

Hill Stations
Tamil Nadu situated in the southern end of the Western and Eastern ghats and Tamil Nadu is the only state having both Western Ghats and Eastern Ghats, the state is home to more than 50 hill stations. Popular among them are Udagamandalam (Ooty), Kodaikanal, Yercaud, Coonoor, Valparai, Yelagiri, Sirumalai, Kotagiri, Kolli Hills, Meghamalai, Pachaimalai Hills, Javadi Hills and the Kalrayan Hills. The Nilgiri hills, Palani hills, Shevaroy hills and Cardamom hills are all abodes of thick forests and wildlife.

Udagamandalam

Popularly known as Ooty situated in the Nilgiri Biosphere Reserve is the most popular Hill station in South India. It provides a scenic view of Nilgiri Hills. The town is connected to the rest of India by road and the popular Nilgiri Mountain Railway, and its historic sites and natural environment attract tourists from all over the country. The list of attractions include :
Government Rose Garden – The largest Rose garden in India.
Ooty Lake
St. Stephen's Church
Ooty Golf Course
Tribal Museum
Doddabetta Peak
Wenlock Downs
Emerald and Avalanche Lakes
Pykara Falls

Kodaikanal

Located in the forests of the Dindigul districts, the hill station of Kodaikanal is fast gaining reputation for its "unspoilt beauty and soothing climate". It is known by the nickname "Princess of Hill stations" and is a leading tourist destination in Tamil Nadu. The most popular sights within the town are:

The Kodaikanal Lake – Kodaikanal's most popular geographic landmark and tourist attraction. Rowboats and pedalos can be hired at the Kodaikanal Boat Club.
Bryant Park: Just east of the lake is the Bryant Park. Over 325 species of trees, shrubs and cacti and flowers.
Coaker's Walk – A paved pedestrian path offering views of the mountains and the plains below.
Green Valley View – Offers views of the plains and the Vaigai River Dam at the South.
Shembaganur Museum of Natural History – A nature museum with over 500 species of local wildlife and 300 exotic orchid species.
Silver Cascade – A waterfall in the region popular with first-time visitors.
Berijam Lake – A calm lake surrounded by nature.

Valparai 

Valparai is a Taluk and hill station in the Coimbatore district of Tamil Nadu, India. It is located 3,500 feet above sea level on the Anaimalai Hills range of the Western Ghats, at a distance of 100 kilometres from Coimbatore. The tea plantations are surrounded by evergreen forest. The region is also a rich elephant tract and is known to have many leopards. The drive to the town from Pollachi passes through the Indira Gandhi Wildlife Sanctuary noted for elephants, boars, lion-tailed macaques, gaur, spotted deer, sambar, and giant squirrels. The area is also rich in birds, including the great hornbill. Water bodies at Monkey Falls and Aliyar Dam are also seen en route. Valparai receives among the highest rainfall in the region during the monsoons (around June).

The Valparai range is also habitat to the Nilgiri tahr, an endemic wild ungulate. These mountain goats inhabit the high ranges and prefer open terrain, cliffs and grass-covered hills, a habitat largely confined to altitudes from 1200 to 2600m in the southern Western Ghats.

Meghamalai 
Meghamalai, popularly called High Wavy Mountains, is a cool and misty mountain range situated in the Western Ghats in Theni district, Tamil Nadu. It is dotted with cardamom plantations and tea estates. The place is situated at an elevation of 1,500 m above sea level and it is rich in flora and fauna. This area, now mostly planted with tea, includes Cloudlands, Highwavys and Manalaar estates, the access to which is now largely restricted. It still includes large untouched remnants of evergreen forest.

Yercaud

The Yercaud hills situated at an altitude of 1515 m in the Salem District is an enchanting and picturesque hill station in the Eastern Ghats. Known for its rich flora and scenic views of the other hills, nearby Yercaud receives a good number of tourists every year for its slightly less-expensive fare as compared to Udagamangalam or Kodaikanal. Yercaud is also a great base for trekking and visiting neighbouring tourist spots like:

Killiyur Falls – a 27-metre-high waterfall.
Lady's seat – a high peak offering views of the plains below.
The Servaroyan Temple – The temple is a narrow and dark cave having the God Servarayan and the Goddess Kaveri inside, which are believed as the deities of the Shevaroy Hills and Cauvery River.
Pagoda Point: Another vantage view point; once adorned with stone built pagodas, it is now home to a large temple.
Heaven's Ledge: A Scenic west-facing cliff situated in Gowri Estate in Yercaud. It has been converted into a campsite to encourage sustainable tourism. It is 15 km from the main town area.

Kolli Hills
Kolli Hills is a mountain range located in central Namakkal District of Tamil Nadu in India. The mountains are relatively untouched by commercial tourism and still retain their natural beauty. The government holds a tourism festival in August. Kolli Hills has been the top choice for nature lovers, hiking enthusiasts, trekking clubs and meditation practitioners among hill stations in Tamil Nadu. Kolli hills is less polluted and mostly unexplored compared to the other hill stations in the state and effective steps re being implemented to improve the area as to make it more tourist-friendly. In comparison to other hill stations in Tamil Nadu, Kolli Hills is not commercialized, less polluted and offers unique mountain ranges. Agaya Gangai is a waterfall situated near the Arappaleeswarar temple. Additionally the district administration has recently developed a botanical garden, Boat house, Cave house, New waterfalls called Masila Falls. The administration also celebrated "Ori festival" with lot of cultural events

And this Kolli Hills hiking fest will happens yearly once from local Volunteer team on the time of rainy season, which is including open dancing fests and swimming Competitions and some small level local events

Coonoor

Part of the Nilgiri Mountain Range, Coonoor is the second largest hill station in the mountain range and is an ideal base for trekking expeditions leading into the Nilgiri Mountains. Coonor is en route the Mettupalayam-Ooty highway as well as the NMR and is an ideal break-point for tourists to Ooty. The Dolhin's Nose Viewpoint and the Lamb's Rock offer views of the mountainside. The attractions in the town and nearby include -

Sim's Park – The main attraction within the town, a small well maintained botanical garden that has several varieties of plants. An annual fruit show is held in the town in summer.
Droog Fort – At a distance of 13 km from Coonoor, the Droog takes one into the past, with the ruins of a fort, which was once used by Tipu Sultan in the 18th century.
Law's Falls
Catherine Falls
 Sri sathya sai baba temple of 20 km from coonoor located at Mel-hosahatty village.
 sri Shiridi sai baba temple of 8 km from coonoor located at yedappalli village.

Waterfalls

Courtallam

Courtallam, the 'Spa of the south', is situated at an elevation of about 167m on the Western Ghats in Tirunelveli District. It is an excellent health resort and is visited by young and old alike, because of the herbal medicinal properties the water is believed to contain. The town is noted for its salubrious climate and natural scenery.

Hogenakkal falls

Hogenakkal waterfalls located close to the border of the adjacent state of Karnataka in the district of Dharmapuri. It is a picnic spot with its waters supposed to be having curative powers. Hogenakkal is set in thick, green woods and is considered both a sacred bathing place and a spa-like health resort. Here the water spreads for miles around. The area is surrounded by hills and offers lovely panoramic view. People can take bath in the Kaveri river, before and beyond the falls. Tamil Nadu Forest Department recently launched Hogenakkal Eco Tourism website to offer ecotourism activities, accommodation, and trekking near Hogenakkal.

Agaya Gangai falls 
Agaya Gangai waterfalls are located in Kolli Hills of the Eastern Ghats. Panchanathi, a jungle stream, cascades down as the Agaya Gangai (En:Ganges of Sky), near the Arapaleeswarar temple atop the Kolli Hills in Namakkal district, Tamil Nadu. It is a  waterfall of the river Aiyaru situated close to Arapaleeswarar temple. It is located in a valley that is surrounded by mountains on all sides. The caves of Korakka Siddhar and Kalaanginatha Siddhar are situated near the Agaya Gangai waterfalls inside the forest area

Catherine falls

Catherine Falls is a double-cascaded waterfall located in Kotagiri (near Coonor), The Nilgiris District, Tamil Nadu and it is also a major tourist spot in Kotagiri. It is on the Mettupalayam road branching off at Aravenu. The upper fall drops to the floor, and is the second highest in the Nilgiri mountains. It can clearly been seen from the top of Dolphin's Nose if seeing the entire waterfall as one total impression is what you are looking for.

Kiliyur falls
Kiliyur Falls is a waterfall in the Shervaroyan hill range in the Eastern Ghats and is a tourist attraction in Yercaud. The waters overflowing the Yercaud Lake fall  into the Kiliyur Valley.

Suruli falls
The Suruli Falls is a two-stage cascading waterfall from the Meghamalai mountain range.
This falls is mentioned in the ancient Tamil epic, Silappathikaram. Near Suruli Falls are 18 caves which represent Indian rock-cut architecture of the 18th century. The Tamil Nadu Tourism Department celebrates summer festival at Suruli falls every year. Near to it another falls is also there, which is produced from the Princess of hills Kodaikanal. And the falls is named as Kumbakkarai, nearest to Periyakulam. It is exactly 45 km away from Suruli falls.

Tirparappu waterfalls
Tirparappu Waterfalls are located in Kanyakumari district. The Kodayar River makes its descent at Thiruparappu. On either side of the river, on the left bank of the river in between the waterfalls and the weir, there is a temple dedicated to Siva enclosed by strong fortification.

Beaches

Marina Beach

Marina Beach one of the world's longest and largest urban beaches, is located on the eastern side of Chennai, adjoining the Bay of Bengal. Watching the sun set and rise from the beach is an enthralling experience. Second largest beach in the world.
With its natural sandy and spacious promenade and gardens, the beach is an attraction for tourists visiting Chennai. The Marina, however, is large enough to accommodate all visitors as well as the hawkers and is often the venue for important state functions.

Elliot Beach
This beach is located in Besant Nagar. Formerly a popular bathing beach, today, it is the favourite rendezvous of the younger generation. Good roads, pavements, illuminated sands, makes a visit to this beach a real pleasure.

Mahabalipuram

Mamallapuram, 58 km south of Chennai, has a beach spanning a distance of over 20 km. Once the site of the erstwhile Pallava Kingdom's seaport, the place today abounds with stone carvings, caves, rock-cut temples also attract tourists. A crocodile farm, snake venom extracting centre, schools of art and sculpture and a wide choice of resorts along the beach draw holiday-seekers all round the year.

Kushi/Ariyamaan Beach 
Ariyaman Beach is situated on the side of the Palk Bay in the Ramanathapuram District. The Ariyaman Beach also features children's park, watch tower and water-based attractions like wind surfing and water scooters. Tourists can also visit the aquarium and museum near the beach. This clean beach features large casuarina trees that provide shade for rest or picnic. The beach is located at a distance of 27 km from the city and measures around 150 metres in width. It extends to a stretch of 2 km and offer boating facility and much more to tourists.

Poompuhar Beach

Once a legendary port city with trade links to ancient Greece and Rome, today Poompuhar is a small coastal town with a superb shoreline that attracts a number of tourists for its vistas during sunrise.

Kanniyakumari
Located at the southernmost tip of India, where the Arabian Sea, the Indian Ocean and the Bay of Bengal meet, lies the Kanyakumari Beach, an important pilgrim center. Kanniyakumari is known for its spectacular sunrises and sunsets, especially on full moon days. The beach itself has multi-coloured sand. There are also other beaches in Kanyakumari like Chothavilai Beach, Circular Fort.

Mangrove Forest

Pichavaram Mangrove Forest 
Pichavaram (MadBoon) has a well-developed mangrove forest. Pichavaram consists of a number of islands interspersing a vast expanse of water covered with green trees. The area is about 1100 hectare and is separated from the sea by a sand bar. The Pichavaram mangrove biotope, consisting of rare species like Avicennia and Rhizophora presents a special attraction, with its peculiar topography and environmental condition. It supports the existence of many rare varieties of economically important shell and finfishes. pichavaram mangrove forest is located between two prominent estuaries, the Vellar estuary in the north and Coleroon estuary in the south. The Vellar-Coleroon estuarine complex forms the Killai backwater and Pichavaram mangroves. The backwaters are interconnected by the Vellar and Coleroon river systems and offer abundant scope for water sports such as rowing, kayaking and canoeing. There are more than 400 water routes available for boating.

Wildlife sanctuaries and National parks

Arignar Anna Zoological Park

It is India's largest zoo in terms of area covering 1,300 acres. Its previous location was set up in 1855 and was the first public zoo in India. The zoo houses 2,553 species of flora and fauna across . As of 2012 the park houses around 1,500 wild species, including 46 endangered species, in its 160 enclosures.[9] As of 2010, there were about 47 species of mammals, 63 species of birds, 31 species of reptiles, 5 species of amphibians, 25 species of fishes, and 10 species of insects in the park.[10] The park, with an objective to be a repository of the state's fauna, is credited with being the second wildlife sanctuary in Tamil Nadu after Mudumalai National Park.

Mudumalai National Park

Mudumalai which translates into "Ancient Hill Range" is situated at the base of the Nilgiri Hills, is the home to several endangered and vulnerable species such as the Nilgiri Tahr, Indian elephant, Tiger, Gaur, Flying Squirrel, Sambar, Nilgiri langur and Indian Leopard to name a few. It shares its borders with Kerala and Karnataka and is separated from Karnataka's Bandipur National Park by the Moyar river.

The lowest point of the sanctuary is the picturesque Moyar Waterfalls. Its rich topography
is as varied as the vegetation, which ranges from dense deciduous forests in the west to scrub jungles in the east interspersed with grasslands, swamps and bamboo brakes.

Mukurthi National Park 
Mukurthi National Park protected area located in the western corner of the Nilgiris Plateau west of Ootacamund hill station in the northwest corner of Tamil Nadu state in the Western Ghats mountain range of South India. The park was created to protect its keystone species, the Nilgiri tahr. The park is characterised by montane grasslands and shrublands interspersed with sholas in a high altitude area of high rainfall, near-freezing temperatures and high winds. It is home to an array of endangered wildlife, including royal Bengal tiger and Asian elephant, but its main mammal attraction is the Nilgiri tahr. The park was previously known as Nilgiri Tahr National Park. The park is a part of Nilgiri Biosphere Reserve, India's first International Biosphere Reserve. As part of the Western Ghats, it is a UNESCO World Heritage Site since 1 July 2012

Vedanthangal Bird Sanctuary 
This is a major Forest Tourist Attraction known as water-bird sanctuary, located not far from Chennai. Vedanthangal Bird Sanctuary is a 30-hectare protected area located in the Kancheepuram District of the state of Tamil Nadu, India. The sanctuary is about 75 kilometres from Chennai on National Highway 45, south of Chengalpattu. The best time to go is October–March, when cormorants, herons, ibis, storks, pelicans and other birds migrate here. Accommodation is available at the Forest Department Rest house.

Anaimalai Tiger Reserve 
The steering committee of Project Tiger granted approval in principle to inclusion of Indira Gandhi WLS and NP under Project Tiger in 2005. IGWS was declared a Project Tiger sanctuary in 2008. Continuance of Project Tiger' in Anaimalai Tiger Reserve for FY 2010/11, at the cost of Rs. 23547,000, was approved by the National Tiger Conservation Authority on 31 August 2010. This tiger reserve, together with the several other contiguous protected forest and grassland habitats, is the core of the Parambikulum-Indira Gandhi tiger habitat landscape complex, with tiger occupancy area of about 3,253 km2.

Sathyamangalam Tiger reserve
This tiger reserve was formed as 42nd tiger reserve of the country and houses 55 tigers. This tiger reserve has the largest population of elephants in the state. This is the largest wildlife sanctuary of Tamil Nadu. The tiger reserve offers wild safari to visitors. The visitors can see many wild animals (depending upon the season), as well as the Moyar river and the green Talamalai plateau. It is located about 70 km from Coimbatore

The Gulf of Mannar Marine National Park 
The Gulf of Mannar Marine National Park is a protected area of India consisting of 21 small islands (islets) and adjacent coral reefs in the Gulf of Mannar in the Indian Ocean. It lies 1 to 10 km away from the east coast of Tamil Nadu, South India for 160 km between Thoothukudi and Dhanushkodi. It is the core area of the Gulf of Mannar Biosphere Reserve which includes a 10 km buffer zone around the park, including the populated coastal area. The park has a high diversity of plants and animals in its marine, intertidal and near shore habitats. Public access inside the Park is limited to glass bottom boat rides

Guindy National Park

Originally a part of the private forest reserve surrounding the Guindy Lodge in the suburbs of Chennai, a portion of it was declared as the Guindy National Park in 1977 and is one of the very few national parks situated within a metropolis.

The park is the home to the endangered Blackbuck and the Spotted deer and has over 130 varieties of birds including raptors such as the honey buzzard and the white-bellied sea eagle. Bird-watching is popular in winter, when migrant birds visit the region. Also located within the park is the Snake Park where one can see the King Cobra, the Python among other reptiles.

The park attracts more than 700,000 visitors every year.

Gallery

See also

Tamil Nadu
Tamil language
Culture of Tamil Nadu
Economy of Tamil Nadu

Outline of Tourism in India

 List of World Heritage Sites in India
 List of national parks of India
 List of lakes of India
 List of waterfalls in India
 List of State Protected Monuments in India
 List of beaches in India
 Incredible India
 List of Geographical Indications in India
 Medical tourism in India
 List of botanical gardens in India
 List of hill stations in India
 List of gates in India
 List of zoos in India
 List of protected areas of India
 List of aquaria in India
 List of forts in India
 List of forests in India
 Buddhist pilgrimage sites in India
 Hindu pilgrimage sites in India
 List of rock-cut temples in India
 Wildlife sanctuaries of India
 List of rivers of India
 List of mountains in India
 List of ecoregions in India
 Coral reefs in India
 List of stadiums in India

References

 
Economy of Tamil Nadu